Janina Falk (born 5 February 2003) is an Austrian Paralympic swimmer who competes in international elite events. She specializes in freestyle. She competed at the 2020 Summer Paralympics. 

She competed at the 2020 European Para Swimming Championships, and 2021 European Para Swimming Championships, winning two silver and a bronze medal.

References

External links 

 News (janina-falk.at)

2003 births
Living people
Paralympic athletes of Austria